(The Coloso Bridge) also known as Bridge Number 1142 is located in Aguada on PR-418 at the  marking, between the Guanábano and Espinar barrios in Aguada.

The bridge rails are built in a warren truss style with steel posts. 

Because the bridge was used for the transport of sugarcane, it was built large enough for truck access. It was built by the Central Coloso, a sugarcane mill for its railway transport system of sugarcane harvest. The bridge allowed access to nearby Guanábano and Espinar barrios in Aguada, and Pueblo in Moca.

Gallery

See also
 National Register of Historic Places listings in Puerto Rico

References

		
Road bridges on the National Register of Historic Places in Puerto Rico
Bridges completed in 1928
Aguada, Puerto Rico
Warren truss bridges
1928 establishments in Puerto Rico
Sugar industry